Alice Louise Bordsen was a  Democratic member of the North Carolina General Assembly representing the state's sixty-third House district, including constituents in Alamance county.  A lawyer from Mebane, North Carolina, Bordsen served until 2012 when she declined to run for an additional term. Bordsen pursued issues of economic development and local initiatives, affordable health care, quality education and worker training, clean air and water, juvenile justice, and public safety.

Bordsen is married and has two daughters and two grandchildren.

References

Members of the North Carolina House of Representatives
Women state legislators in North Carolina
Living people
21st-century American politicians
21st-century American women politicians
Year of birth missing (living people)
People from Mebane, North Carolina